Raphael House Rudolf Steiner School is a coeducational, state integrated composite school in Tirohanga, Lower Hutt. It provides a Waldorf education for Years 1 to 13. Matriculation starts when children are 7 years of age.

Curriculum
The school follows Rudolf Steiner's 3-stage pedagogical model of child development promoted in Waldorf education. The Raphael House  Rudolf Steiner/Waldorf curriculum is cross-referred to the National Curriculum. In 2012 a new Level 3 NZQA approved qualification, known as the Steiner School Certificate was offered to Class 12 (Year 13) students. From 2013 this qualification was offered at Levels 1, 2 and 3 of the New Zealand Qualifications Framework.

The Steiner School Certificate Level 3, has also been approved by Universities NZ, for University Entrance Ad Eundum Statum.

Foreign languages currently taught include:
German 
Japanese

Most overseas student exchanges are with students from German Waldorf schools.

Community
Raphael House offers evening adult education courses on subjects such as health, anthroposophy, and self-development, and provides a small number of rooms for community activities. The school issues a printed and online weekly newsletter called 'The Bush telegraph'to parents which disseminates pertinent community information and also offers advertising space.

Festivals
Raphael House celebrates a number of Christian festivals, namely Easter, Advent, St Nicholas, and Christmas, as well as Midwinter and St Michael's day, as cultural experiences for students and their parents. Preparation for the feast days is considered an important part of the students' experience; for example, the students learn songs and make their own colourful lanterns in the days leading up to the Midwinter festival.

Notable alumni
Anna Paquin - film and television actress, Oscar winner

See also
Curriculum of the Waldorf schools

References

External links
School web site
Pass the Blue Diamond - Stories and contributions from the rich life of Raphael House Rudolf Steiner School, New Zealand
Te Kete Ipurangi
Education Review Office report 2011
Federation of Rudolf Steiner Schools in New Zealand

Educational institutions established in 1979
Secondary schools in the Wellington Region
Waldorf schools in New Zealand
Schools in Lower Hutt
1979 establishments in New Zealand